The 2018 Poznań Open was a professional tennis tournament played on clay courts. It was the fifteenth edition of the tournament which was part of the 2018 ATP Challenger Tour. It took place at the Park Tenisowy Olimpia in Poznań, Poland from 5 to 10 June 2018.

Singles main-draw entrants

Seeds

 1 Rankings are as of 28 May 2018.

Other entrants
The following players received wildcards into the singles main draw:
  Paweł Ciaś
  Victor Vlad Cornea
  Michał Dembek
  Marcel Granollers

The following players received entry into the singles main draw as alternates:
  Tomislav Brkić
  Mitchell Krueger

The following players received entry from the qualifying draw:
  Andrea Arnaboldi
  Mathias Bourgue
  Antoine Escoffier
  Jeremy Jahn

Champions

Singles

  Hubert Hurkacz def.  Taro Daniel 6–1, 6–1.

Doubles

   Mateusz Kowalczyk /  Szymon Walków def.  Attila Balázs /  Andrea Vavassori 7–5, 6–7(8–10), [10–8].

External links
Official Website

2018 ATP Challenger Tour
2018
2018 in Polish tennis